This is a list of the most common U.S. county names, specifically the names with five or more counties sharing the name.

Washington County (31 counties)
All of the Washington Counties in the United States are named for George Washington, first President of the United States.
 Washington County, Alabama
 Washington County, Arkansas
 Washington County, Colorado
 Washington County, Florida
 Washington County, Georgia
 Washington County, Idaho
 Washington County, Illinois
 Washington County, Indiana
 Washington County, Iowa
 Washington County, Kansas
 Washington County, Kentucky
 Washington County, Maine
 Washington County, Maryland
 Washington County, Minnesota
 Washington County, Mississippi
 Washington County, Missouri
 Washington County, Nebraska
 Washington County, New York
 Washington County, North Carolina
 Washington County, Ohio
 Washington County, Oklahoma
 Washington County, Oregon
 Washington County, Pennsylvania
 Washington County, Rhode Island
 Washington County, Tennessee
 Washington County, Texas
 Washington County, Utah
 Washington County, Vermont
 Washington County, Virginia
 Washington County, Wisconsin
 Washington Parish, Louisiana

Jefferson County (26 counties)
Twenty three of the twenty six Jefferson Counties in the United States are directly named for Thomas Jefferson, the third President, and the remaining three are indirectly named for him.
 Jefferson County, Alabama
 Jefferson County, Arkansas
 Jefferson County, Colorado: named for the Territory of Jefferson, which extralegally governed the area before the United States Congress established the Colorado Territory, the territory in turn was named for Thomas Jefferson
 Jefferson County, Florida
 Jefferson County, Georgia
 Jefferson County, Idaho
 Jefferson County, Illinois
 Jefferson County, Indiana
 Jefferson County, Iowa
 Jefferson County, Kansas
 Jefferson County, Kentucky
 Jefferson County, Mississippi
 Jefferson County, Missouri
 Jefferson County, Montana: named for the Jefferson River, in turn named for Thomas Jefferson
 Jefferson County, Nebraska
 Jefferson County, New York
 Jefferson County, Ohio
 Jefferson County, Oklahoma
 Jefferson County, Oregon: named for Mount Jefferson on the county's western boundary, in turn named for Thomas Jefferson
 Jefferson County, Pennsylvania
 Jefferson County, Tennessee
 Jefferson County, Texas
 Jefferson County, Washington
 Jefferson County, West Virginia
 Jefferson County, Wisconsin
 Jefferson Parish, Louisiana

Franklin County (25 counties)
Twenty three of the twenty five Franklin Counties in the United States are named for Benjamin Franklin, the famous Founding Father, printer, scientist, philosopher, and diplomat.

 Franklin County, Alabama
 Franklin County, Arkansas
 Franklin County, Florida
 Franklin County, Georgia
 Franklin County, Idaho: named for Franklin, Idaho, the first town in the state, in turn named for Franklin Richards, an apostle of the Church of Jesus Christ of Latter-day Saints
 Franklin County, Illinois
 Franklin County, Indiana
 Franklin County, Iowa
 Franklin County, Kansas
 Franklin County, Kentucky
 Franklin County, Maine
 Franklin County, Massachusetts
 Franklin County, Mississippi
 Franklin County, Missouri
 Franklin County, Nebraska
 Franklin County, New York
 Franklin County, North Carolina
 Franklin County, Ohio
 Franklin County, Pennsylvania
 Franklin County, Tennessee
 Franklin County, Texas: probably named for Benjamin Cromwell Franklin, an early judge and legislator in Texas
 Franklin County, Vermont
 Franklin County, Virginia
 Franklin County, Washington
 Franklin Parish, Louisiana

Jackson County (24 counties)

Twenty one of the twenty four Jackson Counties in the United States are named for Andrew Jackson, the seventh President.
 Jackson County, Alabama
 Jackson County, Arkansas
 Jackson County, Colorado
 Jackson County, Florida
 Jackson County, Georgia: named for James Jackson, the 23rd governor of Georgia
 Jackson County, Illinois
 Jackson County, Indiana
 Jackson County, Iowa
 Jackson County, Kansas
 Jackson County, Kentucky
 Jackson County, Michigan
 Jackson County, Minnesota: named for Henry Jackson, a member of the first Minnesota Territory legislature
 Jackson County, Mississippi
 Jackson County, Missouri
 Jackson County, North Carolina
 Jackson County, Ohio
 Jackson County, Oklahoma: named for Thomas Jonathan "Stonewall" Jackson, the famous Confederate general
 Jackson County, Oregon
 Jackson County, South Dakota
 Jackson County, Tennessee
 Jackson County, Texas
 Jackson County, West Virginia
 Jackson County, Wisconsin
 Jackson Parish, Louisiana

Lincoln County (24 counties)
Sixteen (possibly seventeen) of the twenty four Lincoln Counties in the United States are named for Abraham Lincoln, the sixteenth President; five other Lincoln counties are named for Benjamin Lincoln, a leading general in the American Revolutionary War and distant relative of Abraham.
 Lincoln County, Arkansas
 Lincoln County, Colorado
 Lincoln County, Georgia: named for Benjamin Lincoln
 Lincoln County, Idaho
 Lincoln County, Kansas
 Lincoln County, Kentucky: named for Benjamin Lincoln
 Lincoln County, Maine: named for the city of Lincoln, England
 Lincoln County, Minnesota
 Lincoln County, Mississippi
 Lincoln County, Missouri: named for Benjamin Lincoln
 Lincoln County, Montana: possibly named for Abraham Lincoln
 Lincoln County, Nebraska
 Lincoln County, Nevada
 Lincoln County, New Mexico
 Lincoln County, North Carolina: named for Benjamin Lincoln
 Lincoln County, Oklahoma
 Lincoln County, Oregon
 Lincoln County, South Dakota: named for Lincoln County, Maine
 Lincoln County, Tennessee: named for Benjamin Lincoln
 Lincoln County, Washington
 Lincoln County, West Virginia
 Lincoln County, Wisconsin
 Lincoln County, Wyoming
 Lincoln Parish, Louisiana

Madison County (20 counties)
Eighteen of the twenty Madison Counties in the United States are named for James Madison, the fourth President, and both of the two exceptions are indirectly named for him.
 Madison County, Alabama
 Madison County, Arkansas
 Madison County, Florida
 Madison County, Georgia
 Madison County, Idaho
 Madison County, Illinois
 Madison County, Indiana
 Madison County, Iowa
 Madison County, Kentucky
 Madison County, Mississippi
 Madison County, Missouri
 Madison County, Montana: named for the Madison River, named in turn for James Madison
 Madison County, Nebraska: probably named for Madison, Wisconsin, where most of the new county's settlers were from, named for James Madison
 Madison County, New York
 Madison County, North Carolina
 Madison County, Ohio
 Madison County, Tennessee
 Madison County, Texas
 Madison County, Virginia
 Madison Parish, Louisiana

Clay County (18 counties)
Fifteen of the eighteen Clay Counties in the United States are named for Henry Clay, the Kentucky statesman. Two of the exceptions, including one in Kentucky, are named for members of Henry Clay's family.
 Clay County, Alabama
 Clay County, Arkansas: named for John Clayton, a member of the Arkansas Senate
 Clay County, Florida
 Clay County, Georgia
 Clay County, Illinois
 Clay County, Indiana
 Clay County, Iowa: named for Henry Clay's son, Henry Clay, Jr., a general who died during the Mexican–American War
 Clay County, Kansas
 Clay County, Kentucky: named for Henry Clay's cousin, Green Clay, a general in the War of 1812
 Clay County, Minnesota
 Clay County, Mississippi
 Clay County, Missouri
 Clay County, Nebraska
 Clay County, North Carolina
 Clay County, South Dakota
 Clay County, Tennessee
 Clay County, Texas
 Clay County, West Virginia

Greene County and variants (17 counties)
All Greene Counties in the United States are named after Nathanael Greene, a major general in the Continental Army during the American Revolutionary War.
 Greene County, Alabama
 Greene County, Arkansas
 Greene County, Georgia
 Greene County, Illinois
 Greene County, Indiana
 Greene County, Iowa
 Greene County, Mississippi
 Greene County, Missouri
 Greene County, New York
 Greene County, North Carolina
 Greene County, Ohio
 Greene County, Pennsylvania
 Greene County, Tennessee
 Greene County, Virginia

Two Green Counties, despite the difference in spelling, are also named after the aforementioned Nathanael Greene.
 Green County, Kentucky
 Green County, Wisconsin

One other county may have been named after Greene, although there is evidence that it was instead named for Richard Grenville, leader of the settlement on Roanoke Island.
 Greensville County, Virginia

Montgomery County (18 counties)

Most (at least 13 out of 18) Montgomery Counties in the United States are named after Richard Montgomery, a major general in the Continental Army killed in the 1775 Battle of Quebec.

 Montgomery County, Alabama (This county was not named for Richard Montgomery, but for another general, Lemuel P. Montgomery; oddly, the city of Montgomery, Alabama in it was named for Richard Montgomery.)
 Montgomery County, Arkansas - Richard Montgomery
 Montgomery County, Georgia - Richard Montgomery
 Montgomery County, Illinois - Richard Montgomery
 Montgomery County, Indiana - Richard Montgomery
 Montgomery County, Iowa - Richard Montgomery
 Montgomery County, Kansas - Richard Montgomery
 Montgomery County, Kentucky - Richard Montgomery
 Montgomery County, Maryland - Richard Montgomery
 Montgomery County, Mississippi (Possibly for Richard Montgomery. Possibly for Montgomery County, Tennessee, from which an early settler came.)
 Montgomery County, Missouri - Richard Montgomery
 Montgomery County, New York - Richard Montgomery
 Montgomery County, North Carolina - Richard Montgomery
 Montgomery County, Ohio - Richard Montgomery
 Montgomery County, Pennsylvania (there is some question as to whether this one was named for Richard Montgomery. It seems to be the case, but it is uncertain.)
 Montgomery County, Tennessee (This county was not named for Richard Montgomery, but for John Montgomery, a local settler)
 Montgomery County, Texas (This county was named after the town of Montgomery, Texas which in turn was named after Montgomery County, Alabama.)
 Montgomery County, Virginia - Richard Montgomery

Union County (18 counties)
 Union County, Arkansas: Named for the statement in the citizen's petition for a new county that the citizens of the area they were petitioning "in the spirit of Union and Unity."
 Union County, Florida: Named to honor the concept of unity.
 Union County, Georgia: Named as a compromise between Whigs, who wanted to name the new county after Henry Clay, and Democrats, who wanted to name it after Andrew Jackson.
 Union County, Illinois
 Union County, Indiana
 Union County, Iowa
 Union County, Kentucky
 Union County, Mississippi
 Union County, New Jersey
 Union County, New Mexico
 Union County, North Carolina
 Union County, Ohio: Named because it is a union of portions of Delaware, Franklin, Logan, and Madison counties.
 Union County, Oregon
 Union County, Pennsylvania
 Union County, South Carolina
 Union County, South Dakota
 Union County, Tennessee
 Union Parish, Louisiana

Fayette and Lafayette counties (17 counties)
Despite the difference in name, all of these counties (including one Louisiana parish) are named after the same individual—Gilbert du Motier, Marquis de Lafayette, a French general who played a major role in the American Revolutionary War.
 Fayette County, Alabama
 Fayette County, Georgia
 Fayette County, Illinois
 Fayette County, Indiana
 Fayette County, Iowa
 Fayette County, Kentucky (coterminous with the city of Lexington)
 Fayette County, Ohio
 Fayette County, Pennsylvania
 Fayette County, Tennessee
 Fayette County, Texas
 Fayette County, West Virginia
 Lafayette County, Arkansas
 Lafayette County, Florida
 Lafayette County, Mississippi
 Lafayette County, Missouri
 Lafayette County, Wisconsin
 Lafayette Parish, Louisiana

See also
 Lists of U.S. county name etymologies
 List of the most common U.S. county names

References

.
County name etymologies